Fredrik Sandell (born 24 December 1972) is a retired Swedish football striker.

References

1972 births
Living people
Swedish footballers
Trelleborgs FF players
Association football forwards
Allsvenskan players
Place of birth missing (living people)